Mycalesis madjicosa is a satyrine butterfly endemic to Japan. The larva feeds on Imperata and Cortaderia selloana.

Subspecies
M. m. madjicosa
M. m. amamiana Fujioka, 1975 (Amami, Okinawa)

References

External links
Images representing Mycalesis at Consortium for the Barcode of Life

madjicosa
Butterflies described in 1868
Butterflies of Japan
Taxa named by Arthur Gardiner Butler